Blackboard Jungle is an Irish quiz show hosted by Ray D'Arcy that aired for seven series on Network 2 between 1991 and 1997. The show, which aired up to three times a week, featured two teams of three representing two competing secondary schools.  A grand final was held at the end of each series.

References

1991 Irish television series debuts
1997 Irish television series endings
1990s Irish television series
Irish quiz shows
Student quiz television series
RTÉ original programming